The Setting Net Lake prospect is a molybdenum prospect located in northwestern Ontario in Canada. The Setting Net Lake prospect has a historic (non-NI 43-101) reserve amounting to 100 million tons of molybdenum ore at a grade of 0.09% Mo.

See also
List of molybdenum mines

References 

Molybdenum mines in Canada